Roth–Theodorovic pistols were a series of prototypes sometimes identified with model years including 1895, 1897 and 1898. These long-recoil, locked-breech, single or double-action semi-automatic pistols were designed by Austrian inventor Wasa Theodorovic with the financial support of George Roth. Early versions were unusually large with an oversize trigger guard and an elongated grip. The internal magazine was top loaded from a stripper clip. A group of 25 pistols submitted for Austrian military trials brought no orders. The design saw numerous modifications including a shorter grip, a decocker, a Tambour grip safety, and a rotating and swiveling ring for attaching a lanyard. Later modifications were made by inventor Karel Krnka. Although these prototypes never entered mass production, some of their features were later incorporated into such successful models as the Frommer Stop and the Roth–Steyr M1907.

See also

External links

References

19th-century semi-automatic pistols
Semi-automatic pistols of Austria